Vasylenko is a Ukrainian surname. The name is a derivative of a given name Vasyl (in English Basil).

People
Artem Vasylenko (born 1989), Ukrainian judoka
Hanna Vasylenko (born 1986), Ukrainian wrestler
Lesia Vasylenko, Ukrainian lawyer and politician
Volodymyr Vasylenko (born 1937), Ukrainian diplomat

See also
Vasylechko
Vasilenko

Ukrainian-language surnames
Patronymic surnames
Surnames from given names